Hercules Phetsimean (เฮอคิวลิส เพชรสี่หมื่น) is a Thai Muay Thai fighter.

Biography
Hercules started Muay Thai at 8 years old in a small gym in his native province of Nakhon Si Thammarat. After joining Phetsimean gym Hercules quickly started competing in the Bangkok circuit and managed to become Lumpinee and Rajadamnern Stadium champion by the age of 15.

AIn December 2018 Hercules lost his Rajadamnern Stadium title to Nadaka Yoshinari in Japan. Following that Hercules gained weight and relinquished his Lumpinee Stadium 105 lbs belt. He then went through weight classes at fast pace. In September 2020 he officially engaged in the Omnoi Stadium annual Isuzu Cup at 140lbs. Hercules lost his first fight counting for the Isuzu Cup against YodIQ P.K.Saenchaimuaythaigym by decision on October 24.

Titles and accomplishments
Lumpinee Stadium
 2018 Lumpinee Stadium 105 lbs Champion

Rajadamnern Stadium
 2018 Rajadamnern Stadium 105 lbs Champion

Omnoi Stadium
 2021 Isuzu Cup runner-up

International Federation of Muaythai Associations
 2022 IFMA World Championships U-23 −67 kg

Fight record

|-  style="background:#cfc;"
| 2023-02-24|| Win ||align=left| Shingo Shibata || ONE Friday Fights 6, Lumpinee Stadium || Bangkok, Thailand || Decision (Unanimous)  || 3 || 3:00
|-  style="background:#fbb;"
| 2022-11-18 || Loss ||align=left| Rangkhao Wor.Sangprapai || Ruamponkon + Prachin || Prachinburi province, Thailand || KO (Elbows) || 2||
|-  style="background:#cfc"
| 2022-10-01 || Win||align=left| Siwakorn Kiatcharoenchai  || Muay Thai Vithee TinThai + Kiatpetch || Buriram province, Thailand || Decision || 5 || 3:00
|-  style="background:#fbb"
| 2022-08-13 || Loss ||align=left| Tapaokaew Singmawin || Ruamponkon Samui, Petchbuncha Stadium || Ko Samui, Thailand || Decision|| 5 ||3:00 
|-  style="background:#fbb;"
| 2022-04-16||Loss||align=left| Siwakorn Kiatjaroenchai || Sor.Sommai + Pitaktham|| Phayao province, Thailand || KO (Punches)|| 2 || 
|-  style="background:#fbb;"
| 2022-02-19|| Loss||align=left| Petchtongchai TBMgym || SuekJaoMuayThai, Siam Omnoi Stadium - Isuzu Cup Final|| Samut Sakhon, Thailand || Decision ||5  ||3:00 
|-
! style=background:white colspan=9 |
|-  style="background:#cfc;"
| 2021-04-03|| Win||align=left| Extra Rongsamak-OrBorJor.Udon || SuekJaoMuayThai, Siam Omnoi Stadium - Isuzu Cup Semi Final || Samut Sakhon, Thailand || Decision || 5 || 3:00
|-  style="background:#cfc;"
| 2021-02-13|| Win||align=left| Petchtongchai TBMgym || SuekJaoMuayThai, Siam Omnoi Stadium - Isuzu Cup || Samut Sakhon, Thailand || Decision || 5 || 3:00
|-  style="background:#cfc;"
| 2020-11-28|| Win||align=left| Traithep Por.Telakun || SuekJaoMuayThai, Siam Omnoi Stadium - Isuzu Cup || Samut Sakhon, Thailand || TKO|| 5 ||
|-  style="background:#fbb;"
| 2020-10-24|| Loss||align=left| YodIQ P.K.Saenchaimuaythaigym|| SuekJaoMuayThai, Siam Omnoi Stadium - Isuzu Cup || Samut Sakhon, Thailand || Decision || 5 || 3:00
|-  style="background:#cfc;"
| 2020-08-27|| Win||align=left| ET Tded99 || Petchwittaya, Rajadamnern Stadium || Bangkok, Thailand || Decision || 5 || 3:00
|-  style="background:#cfc;"
| 2020-07-19|| Win ||align=left| Phetmanee Jitmuangnon || Muaydee VitheeThai, Blue Arena|| Samut Prakan, Thailand || Decision || 5 || 3:00
|-  style="background:#fbb;"
| 2020-03-11|| Loss||align=left| Thanupetch Wor.Sangprapai || Petchwittaya, Rajadamnern Stadium || Bangkok, Thailand || Decision || 5 || 3:00
|-  style="background:#cfc;"
| 2020-02-06|| Win ||align=left| Thanupetch Wor.Sangprapai || Petchwittaya, Rajadamnern Stadium || Bangkok, Thailand || Decision || 5 || 3:00
|-  style="background:#fbb;"
| 2020-01-13|| Loss ||align=left| Luknimit Singklongsi|| Petchwittaya, Rajadamnern Stadium || Bangkok, Thailand || Decision || 5 || 3:00
|-  style="background:#fbb;"
| 2019-12-12|| Loss ||align=left| Luknimit Singklongsi|| OneSongchai, Rajadamnern Stadium || Bangkok, Thailand || Decision || 5 || 3:00
|-  style="background:#cfc;"
| 2019-10-23|| Win ||align=left| DetchChaiya Petchyindeeacademy || Petchwittaya, Rajadamnern Stadium || Bangkok, Thailand || Decision || 5 || 3:00
|-  style="background:#c5d2ea;"
| 2019-09-25|| Draw||align=left| Samingdam Chor.Ajalaboon || Petchwittaya, Rajadamnern Stadium || Bangkok, Thailand || Decision || 5 || 3:00
|-  style="background:#cfc;"
| 2019-08-28|| Win ||align=left| Kongmuangtrang Kaewsamrit || Petchwittaya, Rajadamnern Stadium || Bangkok, Thailand || Decision || 5 || 3:00
|-  style="background:#fbb;"
| 2019-07-22|| Loss||align=left| Kumandoi Petcharoenvit || Petchwittaya, Rajadamnern Stadium || Bangkok, Thailand || Decision || 5 || 3:00
|-  style="background:#cfc;"
| 2019-05-26|| Win ||align=left| Achanai Petchyindeeacademy || Muaydee VitheeThai, Blue Arena|| Samut Prakan, Thailand || Decision || 5 || 3:00
|-  style="background:#cfc;"
| 2019-04-03|| Win ||align=left| SingUdon Or.UdUdon || Petchwittaya, Rajadamnern Stadium || Bangkok, Thailand || Decision || 5 || 3:00
|-  style="background:#cfc;"
| 2019-02-28|| Win ||align=left| Petchprab Chutangduang || PetchChaoPhraya, Rajadamnern Stadium || Bangkok, Thailand || Decision || 5 || 3:00
|-  style="background:#cfc;"
| 2019-02-02|| Win ||align=left| Priewpak SorJor.Vichitmuangpadriew || SuekJaoMuayThai, Omnoi Stadium || Bangkok, Thailand || Decision || 5 || 3:00
|-  style="background:#fbb;"
| 2019-01-02|| Loss||align=left| Chanalert Meenayothin  || Petchwittaya, Rajadamnern Stadium||Bangkok, Thailand || Decision || 5 || 3:00
|-  style="background:#fbb;"
| 2018-12-09 || Loss||align=left| Nadaka Yoshinari || "BOM XX The Battle Of Muay Thai 20"  || Yokohama, Japan || Decision (Unanimous) || 5 || 3:00 
|-
! style=background:white colspan=9 |
|-  style="background:#cfc;"
| 2018-10-31|| Win ||align=left| Sakaengam Jitmuangnon || Petchwittaya, Rajadamnern Stadium || Bangkok, Thailand || Decision || 5 || 3:00
|-  style="background:#fbb;"
| 2018-10-31|| Loss||align=left| Petchanuwat Nor.AnuwatGym || Petchwittaya, Rajadamnern Stadium || Bangkok, Thailand || Decision || 5 || 3:00
|-  style="background:#cfc;"
| 2018-07-26|| Win ||align=left| Ittipon Lookkhlongtan || OneSongchai, Rajadamnern Stadium || Bangkok, Thailand || Decision || 5 || 3:00
|-
! style=background:white colspan=9 |
|-  style="background:#cfc;"
| 2018-06-05|| Win ||align=left| Samuenthep Por Petchsiri ||Lumpinee champion Kruekrai, Lumpinee Stadium || Bangkok, Thailand ||Decision ||5  ||3:00
|-
! style=background:white colspan=9 |
|-  style="background:#cfc;"
| 2018-05-02|| Win ||align=left| Samuenthep Por Petchsiri || Petchwittaya, Rajadamnern Stadium || Bangkok, Thailand || Decision ||5  ||3:00
|-  style="background:#fbb;"
| 2018-03-23|| Loss||align=left| Yodpetch EmyMuayThaiGym || Khunsuektrakoonyang, Lumpinee Stadium || Bangkok, Thailand ||Decision ||5  ||3:00
|-  style="background:#cfc;"
| 2018-02-01|| Win ||align=left| Palangpop Por.Muangpetch || OneSongchai, Rajadamnern Stadium || Bangkok, Thailand || KO || 4  ||
|-  style="background:#cfc;"
| 2018-01-11|| Win ||align=left| Ittipon Lookkhlongtan || Petchwittaya, Rajadamnern Stadium || Bangkok, Thailand || Decision || 5 || 3:00
|-  style="background:#c5d2ea;"
| 2017-12-07|| Draw||align=left| Ittipon Lookkhlongtan || OneSongchai, Rajadamnern Stadium || Bangkok, Thailand || Decision || 5 || 3:00
|-  style="background:#cfc;"
| 2017-11-08|| Win ||align=left| Theplikit Sitajarnchao || Petchwittaya, Rajadamnern Stadium || Bangkok, Thailand || Decision || 5 || 3:00
|-
| colspan=9 | Legend:    

|-  style="background:#fbb;"
| 2022-06-03|| Loss ||align=left| Mohammed Mardi || IFMA World Championships 2022, Final|| Abu Dhabi, United Arab Emirates || Decision (Unanimous)||3  ||3:00 
|-
! style=background:white colspan=9 |

|-  style="background:#cfc;"
| 2022-06-01|| Win ||align=left| Rachid Hamza || IFMA World Championships 2022, Semi Finals|| Abu Dhabi, United Arab Emirates || Decision (Unanimous) || 3 || 3:00 

|-  style="background:#cfc;"
| 2022-05-30|| Win ||align=left| Nail Khaliullin || IFMA World Championships 2022, Quarter Finals|| Abu Dhabi, United Arab Emirates || Decision || 3 ||3:00 

|-  style="background:#cfc;"
| 2022-05-28||Win||align=left| Yahia Hajeer || IFMA World Championships 2022, First Round|| Abu Dhabi, United Arab Emirates || Decision (Unanimous) || 3 ||3:00 

|-
| colspan=9 | Legend:

References

Hercules Phetsimean
ONE Championship kickboxers 
Living people
2002 births
Hercules Phetsimean